Parascombrops argyreus is a species of fish in the family Acropomatidae.

Distribution 
They can be found in the Indian Ocean and the West Pacific. This includes Hawaii, the Tasman Sea to northeastern New Zealand, and off south-east Africa. It is possible that they live in the southwestern Pacific.

References

argyreus
Fish described in 1897